Crematogaster anthracina is a species of ant in tribe Crematogastrini. It was described by Smith in 1857.

References

anthracina
Insects described in 1857